Sycamore High School may refer to:
Bishop Sycamore High School scandal, Columbus, Ohio
Sycamore High School (Georgia), Sycamore, Georgia
Sycamore High School (Sycamore, Illinois)
Sycamore High School (Cincinnati, Ohio)
Sycamore High School (Tennessee), Pleasant View, Tennessee